Lillian Glinn (May 10, 1902 – July 22, 1978) was an American classic female blues and country blues singer and songwriter. She spent most of her career in black vaudeville. Among her popular recordings were "Black Man Blues," "Doggin' Me Blues" and "Atlanta Blues." The blues historian Paul Oliver commented that there were a number of female blues singers who "deserve far greater recognition than they have had", and one of those he cited was Glinn.

Biography
Glinn was born in Hillsboro, Texas, and later moved to Dallas.

She was first noticed singing spirituals in church by Hattie Burleson, who also went on to become a performer. Under Burleson's guidance, Glinn became successful in vaudeville and by 1927 was signed to a recording contract with Columbia. Glinn took part in six recording sessions, in New Orleans, Atlanta and Dallas, from 1927 to 1929. She recorded a total of twenty-two tracks. Her specialty was slow blues ballads utilizing her rich and heavy contralto voice. Her songs concentrated on the harsher side of life and sometimes included sexual innuendo. Her recordings, including her April 1928 recording of "Shake It Down", gained her national recognition.

The musicologist David Evans noted that "it is quite likely that many of Lillian Glinn's blues without any listed composer were her own material. If so, she would be the exception among Columbia's female blues singers."

Following this period of activity, Glinn retreated to a church-based life and moved to California, where she married the Rev. O. P. Smith.

Her entire recorded work was released in 1994 by Document Records.

She was interviewed and photographed by Paul Oliver in 1971.

Compilation discography

See also
List of classic female blues singers

References

1902 births
1978 deaths
American blues singers
American women singers
Songwriters from Texas
Singers from Texas
People from Hillsboro, Texas
People from Dallas
Classic female blues singers
Country blues musicians
20th-century American women
20th-century American people